Michael Rzehaczek (born 17 January 1967) is a retired German football midfielder. He was forced to retire due to knee injuries.

Career

Statistics

References

External links
 

1967 births
Living people
People from Recklinghausen
Sportspeople from Münster (region)
German footballers
VfL Bochum players
VfL Bochum II players
Bundesliga players
Association football midfielders
Footballers from North Rhine-Westphalia